Cameron MacPherson (born 29 December 1998) is a Scottish professional footballer who plays as a midfielder for Scottish Premiership club St Johnstone.

Career
MacPherson started out in the youth system of St Mirren, prior to appearing for the first-team. He made his career debut on 21 January 2017 during a Scottish Cup fixture with Dundee, while his Championship bow arrived ten months later against Falkirk on 21 October. In total, MacPherson featured six times for St Mirren throughout 2017–18. On 30 January 2018, Stranraer of League One loaned MacPherson. One goal, versus Arbroath on 20 February, in nine matches followed as the club finished 5th. He returned to his parent club in August 2018, before netting his first goal for them in December against Aberdeen at St Mirren Park.

In October 2019, MacPherson signed a two-year contract extension with Saints, keeping him at the club until 2022.

MacPherson moved on loan to St Johnstone in August 2021. After MacPherson signed a pre-contract agreement with St Johnstone in January 2022, his parent club St Mirren recalled him in order to negotiate terms for selling him to St Johnstone on a permanent deal. MacPherson joined St Johnstone permanently for an undisclosed fee on 24 January.

Career statistics

Honours
St Mirren
Scottish Championship: 2017–18

References

External links

1998 births
Living people
Footballers from Glasgow
Scottish footballers
Association football midfielders
Scottish Professional Football League players
St Mirren F.C. players
Stranraer F.C. players
St Johnstone F.C. players